Minuscule 340 (in the Gregory-Aland numbering), ε 416 (Soden), is a Greek minuscule manuscript of the New Testament, on parchment. Palaeographically it has been assigned to the 14th century. 
It has marginalia.

Description 

The codex contains a complete text of the four Gospels on 243 parchment leaves. It is written in one column per page, in 21-22 lines per page. It has a lot of later corrections.

The text of the original codex was not divided, it was divided by a later hand. There are two systems of division. There is also a division according to the Ammonian Sections, with references to the Eusebian Canons.

The later hand marked church lessons at the beginning by incipits, for liturgical use.

Text 
Kurt Aland did not place the Greek text of the codex in any Category.
It was not examined by the Claremont Profile Method.

History 

The manuscript was examined by Pasino, Scholz, and Burgon. It was added to the list of New Testament manuscripts by Scholz (1794-1852).
C. R. Gregory saw it in 1886.

The manuscript is currently housed at the Turin National University Library (B. VII. 16) in Turin.

See also 

 List of New Testament minuscules
 Biblical manuscript
 Textual criticism

References

Further reading 

 Giuseppe Passino, Codices Manuscripti Bibliohecae Regii Taurinensis Athenaei, Turin 1742, vol. 2.

Greek New Testament minuscules
14th-century biblical manuscripts